Just the Beginning is a studio album by American country artist Margo Smith and her daughter, Holly. It was released in 1991 via Homeland Records and contained ten tracks. The album was a collection of duets between mother and daughter. It was also the duo's first album project together.

Background, content and release
Margo Smith had first found commercial success as a country singer during the late 1970s. Recording for 20th Century Fox and later Warner Bros., she had major hits with songs like "There I Said It", "Don't Break the Heart That Loves You" and "Still a Woman". After her chart success faded, Smith recorded for independent record labels during the 1980s. In the early 1990s, Smith formed a Christian/gospel duo with her daughter, Holly Smith. In 1991, the mother-daughter collaboration signed a recording contract with Homeland Records. They recorded their first studio album during the same time. Just the Beginning was a collection of ten tracks, all of which were duets between mother and daughter. The project was produced Bobby All and Gary McSpadden.

Just the Beginning was released on the Homeland label in 1991. It was Margo Smith's first collaborative release in her career. It was Holly Smith's first album release as a music artist. The album was issued as a compact disc. The album's release would bring success for the Smith duo. Their songs would later find success on contemporary Christian radio, however, no specific singles are mentioned. They would continue collaborating through the 1990s and release more music as a duo.

Track listing

Personnel
All credits are adapted from the liner notes of Just the Beginning.

Musical personnel
 Craig Adams – Background vocals
 Paul Brannon – Acoustic guitar, electric guitar
 Gary Burnette – Acoustic guitar, mandolin
 Mark Casstevens – Acoustic guitar
 Michael English – Background vocals
 Sonny Garrish – Steel guitar
 Rob Hajacos – Fiddle
 Camille Harrison – Background vocals
 Tom Hemby – Acoustic guitar, dobro, electric guitar, mandolin
 Phil Kristianson – Piano
 Jerry Kroon – Drums
 Terry McMillan – Harmonica
 Duncan Mullins – Bass
 Matt Pearson – Bass
 Holly Smith – Background vocals, lead vocals
 Margo Smith – Background vocals, lead vocals
 Dawn Thomas – Background vocals

Technical personnel
 Barry Dixon – Engineer
 Craig Hanson – Engineer, mixing
 Terry McMillan – Percussion
 Gary McSpadden – Producer
 Scott Sheriff – Engineer, keyboard overdubs
 D. Bergen White – String arrangement, conductor, strings

Release history

References

Footnotes

Books

 

1991 albums
Margo Smith albums